Harold Leon Breeden (3 October 1921 – 11 August 2010) was a jazz educator and musician.

Biography
When he was three his parents moved to Wichita Falls, Texas, where he grew up and graduated from high school. He attended Texas Wesleyan College in Fort Worth on a scholarship and later transferred to Texas Christian University where he completed both his bachelor's and master's degrees. While doing graduate work at Columbia University in New York City, he studied clarinet with Reginald Kell who had immigrated to the U.S. in 1948. Benny Goodman began studies with Kell in 1949.

Breeden used his given name "Harold" only while serving in the Army. During the early part of World War II, he served in the 69th Infantry Division band as music librarian and played in the band at Ft. Bliss.

In 1944, after military duty, he became the Director of Bands at Texas Christian University and later served as Director of Bands at Grand Prairie High School from 1953 to 1959. In 1959, M.E. "Gene" Hall, Founding Director of Jazz Studies at the University of North Texas College of Music, recommended Breeden to replace Hall as Director of Jazz Studies, where Breeden remained until his retirement in 1984. A classically trained clarinetist, Breeden also played saxophone and studied composition and arranging at Texas Christian. He was a teaching assistant under Don Gillis, whom he worked with in New York City from 1950 to 1952 as his assistant. He married Bonna Joyce McKee, whom he had met while working on his master's degree at Texas Christian.

Gillis was producer of the NBC Symphony, conducted by Arturo Toscanini. Breeden met with and wrote arrangements for Arthur Fiedler, conductor of the Boston Pops. Gillis recommended Breeden for work. In 1950, after hearing his first arrangements for the group, Fiedler offered Breeden a position as staff writer and arranger for the orchestra, but with an ill father, Breeden declined and moved back to Texas. He worked as music coordinator for KXAS-TV in Fort Worth, known at the time as WBAP-TV.

In the last several years of his life, Breeden frequently soloed on clarinet with The Official Texas Jazz Orchestra.

Breeden died of natural causes on August 11, 2010 in Dallas. The Associated Press release of Breeden's death referred to him as a legendary director who made the One O'Clock Lab Band internationally famous.

Career 
Breeden was the chairman of Jazz Studies and director of the One O'Clock Lab Band at the University of North Texas College of Music from 1959 to 1981. The One O'Clock Lab Band is the highest level of nine big bands at the College of Music. The College of Music is a comprehensive music school with the largest enrollment of any music institution accredited by the National Association of Schools of Music and the first in the world to offer a degree in jazz studies at the collegiate level.

Breeden took the One O'Clock Lab Band to London, Paris, Portugal, Russia, Mexico, Germany, Spain, and Switzerland. The band played throughout the U.S. and at the Spoleto Music Festival. The band performed at the White House for presidents Johnson, Carter, and Reagan and for the U.S. visit by the King and Queen of Thailand. The band has accompanied Ella Fitzgerald and has produced musicians for the Stan Kenton and Woody Herman bands. There are more than 600 recordings of the jazz band's performances in the North Texas School of Music archives.

His students included Dee Barton, Herb Ellis, Paul Guerrero, Galen Jeter, Marc Johnson, Bobby Knight, Sparky Koerner, Lou Marini, Lyle Mays, Byron Parks, Neal Ramsay, Jim Riggs, Marvin Stamm, and Lanny Steele.

Awards and honors

References
General references

 "Leon Breeden interview," Voice of America (1977); 

Inline citations

1921 births
2010 deaths
American jazz bandleaders
American jazz clarinetists
American jazz composers
American jazz educators
American music arrangers
Hard bop clarinetists
Jazz arrangers
American male jazz composers
Post-bop clarinetists
Swing clarinetists
University of North Texas College of Music faculty
United States Army personnel of World War II